Farahabad (also Romanized as Faraḩābād; also known as Farābād) is a village in Jorjafak Rural District, in the Central District of Zarand County, Kerman Province, Iran. At the 2006 census, its population was 23, in 8 families.

References 

Populated places in Zarand County